The National Junior College Athletic Association (NJCAA) Men's Division III Basketball Championships consists of eight teams playing over a three-day period (Thursday-Saturday) in March to determine a National Champion. The tournament field is made up of teams that win either region or district championships that are required to earn entry into the tournament.

How The Tournament Works 

The Tournament is a standard eight-team tournament.  Each team will play three games in the Tournament to determine first through eighth places.

One qualifier will emerge from each of the following districts

Before teams begin to qualify for the tournament, a Blind Draw is done to determine the match-ups between the different districts in the Quarterfinals.  

The Semi-Finals of the Tournament consist of the Winners of Game 1 and Game 2 of the Quarterfinals playing each other followed by the Winners of Game 3 and Game 4 of the Quarterfinals.

The Consolation Games consist of the Losers of Games 1 and 2 of the Quarters playing each other followed by the Losers of Games 3 and 4 of the Quarters playing each other. 

On the final day of the Tournament, teams play each other to find out which place they will finish. 

Three teams ranging from 2nd place to 4th place are guaranteed to finish 2-1, with the National Title game loser finishing in 2nd. 

Teams finishing from 5th place to 7th place will finish 1-2. 

Only one team will finish 0-3 and that team will place in 8th. 

The only team that finishes the tournament 3-0 will be the National Champion.

Tournament Hosts 

SUNY Delhi (1991–2010) 

Sullivan County Community College (2011–2016)

Rochester Community and Technical College (2017-)

Past Tournament Results 

The list of NJCAA Division III Men's Basketball Championship winners, along with runners-up and final scores, follows.

Championship Leaders

See also
NJCAA Men's Division I Basketball Championship
NJCAA Men's Division II Basketball Championship
NJCAA Women's Basketball Championship

External links
 

Basketball, Men's Division III